Below is a list of California state and regional high school football champions sanctioned by the California Interscholastic Federation since the organization began holding state championship games in 2006. High schools in the state are divided into four divisions (three prior to 2008) based roughly on enrollment; since 2008, there has also been an Open Division for which all schools are eligible. Starting in 2015, a new format was implemented to increase the number of state bowl games from 5 to 15, thus allowing every CIF Section champion to qualify.

State Champions

Regional Champions

Northern California Champions

Southern California Champions

Notes

References

American football in California
Football, high school champions
High school football in the United States
High school sports in California